Wolverhampton Metropolitan Borough Council elections in 1980 were held on Thursday 1 May.

Following the elections the Labour Party had overall control of the council.

The composition of the council prior to the election was:

Labour 28
Conservative 30
Wolverhampton Association of Ratepayers 2

The composition of the council following the election was:

Labour 32
Conservative 28

Election results

Conservative gain from Ratepayers

External links

1980
1980 English local elections
1980s in the West Midlands (county)